Michael Eugene Wells (born June 18, 1951) is a former NFL quarterback who played briefly in 1977. He was originally drafted in 1973 by the Minnesota Vikings but did not appear in a Vikings regular-season game.  He played for the Cincinnati Bengals in 1977 but saw very limited action.

Wells was a high-school football All American at Normal Community High School in Normal, Illinois before going on to play college football at the University of Illinois.  He was an all-Big Ten Conference selection in 1972 before being drafted in the fourth round by Minnesota.  A three-sport star in high school, he was also selected by the San Diego Padres in the 1969 Major League Baseball Draft, but did not sign and never played professional baseball.

1951 births
Living people
American football quarterbacks
Illinois Fighting Illini football players
Cincinnati Bengals players
New York Giants players